Dubovy Ovrag is a rural locality (a selo) in Svetloyarsky District, Volgograd Oblast, Russia. The population was 2,091 as of 2010. There are 12 streets.

Geography 
Dubovy Ovrag is located 29 km southwest of Svetly Yar (the district's administrative centre) by road. Bolshiye Chapurniki is the nearest rural locality.

References 

Rural localities in Svetloyarsky District